Ferdinand Laurberg (8 March 1904 – 9 October 1941) was an Estonian bandy player and footballer (goal keeper).

He was born in Vihterpalu, Harju County.

His club (Tallinna Sport) was 6-times Estonian champion in bandy. He was a member of Estonia men's national bandy team.

He played also football. In 1929 his club won Estonian championships. He played one match for Estonia men's national football team.

References

1904 births
1941 deaths
Estonian bandy players
Estonian footballers
People from Lääne-Harju Parish